Adish C. Aggarwala is a jurist and the President of International Council of Jurists, Chairman of All India Bar Association, Convener of Indian Council of Jurists, Chairman of India Legal Information Institute, Secretary General of All India Senior Advocates Association and Patron of All India Law Students Association.

Publications
In 2009, Aggarwala authored the book Constitution of India. The foreword was contributed by Justice K.G. Balakrishnan, the 37th Chief Justice of India, which was presented to the President of India, Pratibha Devisingh Patil.

He had also co-authored (with British author Ms. Sarah J. Marchington) the biographical coffee table book, 'Narendra Modi - A Charismatic & Visionary Statesman'. The book contains forewords from Mr. Amit Shah, President, Bharatiya Janata Party (BJP) and Mrs. Nirmala Sitharaman, Union Minister of Finance and Messages from Mr. Nitin Gadkari, Union Minister of Road Transport & Highways and Shipping Ministry of Micro, Small and Medium Enterprises; Mr. Piyush Goyal, Union Minister of Railways and Coal and Yog Guru Swami Ramdev, Founder, Patanjali Yogpeeth (Trust) and Prefaces from Yogi Adityanath, Chief Minister of Uttar Pradesh; Mr. Prakash Javadekar, Union Minister of Environment, Forest & Climate Change and Information & Broadcasting; Mr. Dharmendra Pradhan, Union Minister of Petroleum & Natural Gas and Steel; Mr. Manohar Lal Khattar, Chief Minister of Haryana and Mr. Indresh Kumar, Member, National Executive Committee and Rashtriya Swayamsevak Sangh (RSS).

References 

20th-century Indian lawyers
Living people
1956 births